Hari Anand Barari (1 April 1929 – 10 January 2016) was an Indian Intelligence Bureau officer who served as its director between November 1984 and March 1987. Upon his retirement from the service, he was appointed as the Governor of Haryana on 22 February 1988 and remained in office till 6 February 1990. He was born in Bikrampur in 1929. Barari died on 10 January 2016, at the age of 86.

See also
List of Governors of Haryana

References

External links
 Hari Anand Barari

1929 births
2016 deaths
Governors of Haryana